Coleophora soffneriella is a moth of the family Coleophoridae. It is found in Italy, Croatia, Albania, Greece, Crete and Bulgaria.

The larvae possibly feed on Juncus. They feed on the generative organs of their host plant.

References

soffneriella
Moths of Europe
Moths described in 1961